Lech Rypin is a Polish football club from Rypin. They are currently playing in IV liga (V level). 
They played in III liga in the seasons 1976/1977, 1978/1979 and 1997/1998 to.

External links
 Lech Rypin official website (Polish)
 Lech Rypin at the Fans  website (Polish)
 Lech Rypin at the 90minut.pl website (Polish)

Association football clubs established in 1922
1922 establishments in Poland
Rypin County
Football clubs in Kuyavian-Pomeranian Voivodeship